The Asam Sahitya Sabha is a non Government, non profit, literary organisation of Assam. It was founded in December 1917 in Assam, India to promote the culture of Assam and Assamese literature. A branch of the organisation named Singapore Sahitya Sabha was launched in Singapore on July 28, 2019.

History 
Till 1826 AD. Assam Territory was ruled mainly by Kachari, Ahoms in the entirety of Brahmaputra Valley and Koch. In 1826, after the Treaty of Yandabo the administration of Assam was passed down to the British, till independence in 1947. Since then Assam has been an integral part of India.

However, the history of modern Assam, modern Assamese language and literature and culture found their starting points in the early part of the 19th century. Since 1872 some efforts were made to build up some organisations to work for the development of Assamese language, literature and culture of the modern period.

Before the formal formation of Asam Sahitya Sabha, Sahitya Kandari Padmanath Gohain Baruah had established Kohima Sahitya Sabha at kohima, Nagaland, in the month of December 1895. Padma Nath Gohain Baruah was Founder Secretary and a Bengali Gentlemen Mr. Nabin Chandra Bhattacherjee was the Founder President. There was an Office Building at the Heart of the Kohima Town, which was known as "LAL GHAR" due to painting with Red color. ( See Mor Xuworon, biography of Padma Nath Gohain Baruah). Late Govinda Chandra Paira, Dhan Bahadur Sonar and Hari Prasad Gorkha Rai were the main product of Kohima Sahitya Sabha, who were Honored by awarding Literary Pension by the Assam Government.  The Kohima Sahitya Sabha is still alive (till Nov. 2013). It has an own Bhawan at P.R.Hill, Kohima, Opposite Nagaland Police Headquarters. The Bhawan was exchanged by the Nagaland Government with the earlier one, which was known as LAL GHAR and taken by the Nagaland Government in the year 1978.

Sahitya Sabha festivals
The conference of the Asam Sahitya Sabha is held biennially. First conference of Asam Sahitya Sabha was held at Sivasagar, Assam. Except regular biennially seasons in 2000 and 2002 special session was held at Jorhat and Kalgachia. On 31 January 1–4 February 2013 at Biswaratna Dr. Bhupen Hazarika Samannay Khetra, Barpeta Road, an administrative circle of Barpeta District of Assam. The Sabha's 2015 session held at Kaliabor, Nagaon.
The current conference will be held in Padmanath Gohain Baruah Khetra, Rupahi-Jerenga Pathar, Rudrasagar, Sivasagar  from 8 to 12 February 2017.

Asam Sahitya Sabha Patrika

Asam Sahitya Sabha Patrika (Ôxôm Xahityô Xôbha Pôtrika) is an official journal of the Asam Sahitya Sabha. The first issue appeared in October 1927. Chandradhar Barua was the founder editor of the journal.

Objectives
 To make all round development of the Assamese language, literature and the culture of the State.
 Publications of Dictionary, Research works, monographs on languages, literature, culture, tribes and races etc., books on literary criticism, complete works of the great writers of Assam etc.
 To enquire, collect and research on ancient literature of the State of Assam.
 To provide financial help to the deserving writers who cannot afford to publish their books and literature for financial stringency.
 To promote music, art and sculpture of the State.
 To bring out leaflets, pamphlets etc. in order to publicize the Assamese language and literature.
 To promote exchange plans and schemes between Literature and Culture.
 To do such work which helps in expanding development of Assamese Language, Literature and Culture.

Presidents

The first president of Asam Sahitya Sabha was Padmanath Gohain Baruah during the inaugural conference at Sibsagar in 1917.

See also
 Sivasagar Zila Sahitya Sabha : Ramdhenu
 Asam Sahitya Sabha Patrika
 Shanti Sahitya Mandir, No-mati Shakha Sahitya Sabha
 List of Asam Sahitya Sabha
 Oxomiya Bhaxa Unnati Xadhini Xobha
 Asom Sahitya Sabha Presidents Category
 Assamese literature
 Assamese Language Movement
 Manipuri Sahitya Parishad
Sadou Asom Lekhika Samaroh Samiti

References

External links

 
 Asom Sahitya Sabha, A contemporary analysis at timesofassam.com website.
 Video Clip of Chandra Kanta Handique Bhawan, Jorhat, Assam at ignca.nic.in.

Culture of Assam
Assamese literature
Jorhat
Indic literature societies
Organizations established in 1917
Organisations based in Assam
Book publishing companies of India
Assamese language
1917 establishments in India
Language regulators